The Huaisheng Mosque (also known as the Lighthouse Mosque and the Great Mosque of Canton) is the main mosque of Guangzhou. Rebuilt many times over its history, it is traditionally thought to have been originally built over 1,300 years ago, which would make it one of the oldest mosques in the world.

In China, the most unusual feature of the mosque is its pointed 36 metre minaret, the Guangta or Kwangtah. Although this meant the "Plain Pagoda" in reference to its unadorned surface,<ref name=eb>{{citation |contribution=Canton |title=''Encyclopædia Britannica, 9th ed., Vol. V |editor-last=Baynes |editor-first=Thomas Spencer |display-editors=0 |publisher=Charles Scribner's Sons |location=New York |date=1878 |ref= |page=37 }}.</ref> it is also sometimes taken to mean "lighthouse" and gave the mosque its alternate name. Somewhat similar "minimalist" minarets can be seen outside China, e.g. at the Khan's Mosque in  Kasimov, Russia. The mosque was visited by Tim Severin's crew of the Sohar, that sailed into Canton from Muscat in July 1981, recreating the fictional voyage of Sinbad the Sailor.

 History 

Old Chinese Muslim manuscripts say the mosque was built in 627 by Sa'd ibn Abi Waqqas, a Companion of the Prophet who supposedly came on to China in the 620s. Although modern secular scholars do not find any historical evidence that Sa'd ibn Abi Waqqas actually visited China, they agree that the first Muslims must have arrived to China within the 7th century, and that the major trade centers, such as Guangzhou, Quanzhou, and Yangzhou, probably'' already had their first mosques built during the Tang dynasty, even though no reliable sources attesting to their actual existence has been found so far.

The minaret measures 36 meter high and consists of two stories, it was the highest building in the city until the beginning of the 20th century. it was a valued unit in the Middle Ages; it was used as a light house, a wind vane, and control tower.

It is very likely that the mosque existed during the early years of the Song dynasty. In 1349, Ramadan ibn Alauddin, the first named Korean Muslim, was buried in the mosque cemetery. The mosque was rebuilt in 1350 then again in 1695 after being destroyed in a fire. The Huaisheng Light Tower or minaret was built at an earlier period. As late as the 19th century, the minaret tower was one of the major landmarks of Guangzhou.

The Tatar traveler Abdurreshid Ibrahim who was an acquaintance of one of the Mosque's ahongs, Wang Kuan, was dismissive of the claim that this mosque was built by Sa'd ibn Abi Waqqas. He called it a peculiar idea:

Transportation
The mosque is accessible within walking distance south east of Ximenkou Station of Guangzhou Metro.

See also
 Islam in China
 List of mosques in China
 Islamic architecture & art
 Timeline of Islamic history

Notes

References

External links

Article and pictures on archnet.org

7th-century mosques
Religious buildings and structures in Guangzhou
Mosques in China
Yuexiu District
Major National Historical and Cultural Sites in Guangdong